The R61 is a long provincial route in South Africa that connects Beaufort West with Port Shepstone via Graaff-Reinet, Komani (previously Queenstown), Mthatha and Port Edward.

The R61 is co-signed with the N9 for 103 kilometres from Aberdeen through Graaff-Reinet to Bethesdaweg, and with the N6 for 18 kilometres near Queenstown.

Route

KwaZulu-Natal
The R61 begins in Port Shepstone at an interchange with the N2 Highway from Durban (at the Oribi Toll Plaza). As the N2 leaves the freeway at an off-ramp and becomes the road westwards towards Harding and Kokstad, the R61 takes over as the freeway south-south-west through the KwaZulu-Natal South Coast. As the 1st section is maintained by SANRAL, the R61 is a toll road for 22 km from the N2 Interchange, through Shelly Beach, Margate and Ramsgate, up to Southbroom. At Southbroom, it stops being both a toll road and a highway. From Port Shepstone to Southbroom, the R61 is followed by the R620.

From Southbroom the R61 resumes south-south-west for 25 kilometres to Port Edward. Just after Port Edward, the R61 leaves the KwaZulu-Natal Province and crosses the Mtamvuna River via the C. H. Mitchell Bridge into the Eastern Cape Province.

Eastern Cape
From the provincial boundary (Mtamvuna River), the R61 heads north-west for 50 km to the town of Bizana, which it bypasses to the south. From Bizana, the R61 continues westwards for 25 kilometres to reach a junction with the R394 Road, where the R61 turns southwards and heads 110 kilometres, through Flagstaff and Lusikisiki, to cross the Mzimvubu River and bypass the town of Port St. Johns to the north. Just after crossing the river, it continues westwards for 87 kilometres, bypassing Libode, to the city of Mthatha, where it crosses the Mthatha River and meets the N2 National Route again in the city centre.

From Mthatha, the R61 heads westwards for 83 kilometres as the All Saints Neck Pass, bypassing Mthatha Airport, to the town of Ngcobo, where it meets the eastern terminus of the R58 Road and the R61 turns to the south-south-west. At the R409 intersection near Tsomo, the R61 turns to the west and heads for 80 kilometres, through Cofimvaba and Qamata, to reach a t-junction with the N6 National Route. The R61 joins the N6 and they become one road north-west into the town of Komani (formerly Queenstown). At the roundabout with Barrable Street in Komani, the R61 becomes its own road west-south-west and after almost 2 kilometres, it meets the northern terminus of the R67 Road at a roundabout. The R61 heads westwards for 136 kilometres, through Tarkastad, to the town of Cradock, where it meets the N10 National Route. The R61 & N10 are one road northwards through the city centre of Cradock, continuing by a left turn (Commissioner Street), a right turn (JA Calata Street) and another left turn, to cross the Great Fish River.

The R61 and the N10 remain as one road for another 4.5 km west-north-west, before the R61 becomes its own road westwards. The R61 continues for 85 kilometres as the Wapadsberg Pass to reach a junction with the N9 National Route south-east of Bethesdaweg. They are one road southwards for 46 km into the town of Graaff-Reinet, where they meet and are co-signed for a few kilometres with the R63 Route, crossing the Sundays River. From Graaff-Reinet, the R61 & N9 remain as one road west-south-west for 55 km up to the town of Aberdeen. At the 4-way-junction with Hoop Street (R338), the R61 stops co-signing with the N9 and becomes the road westwards from this junction.

From Aberdeen, the R61 heads westwards for 148 kilometres, crossing into the Western Cape Province, to enter the town of Beaufort West and reach its western terminus at a junction with the N1 and N12 National Route co-signage.

Wild Coast Highway

As of 2018, there are plans to give the first section of the R61, from its starting junction with the N2 in Port Shepstone to its other junction with the N2 in Mthatha, to the N2 National Route. The project is scheduled for completion in 2024. Together with the N2 from Mthatha to East London, this route will be named the "Wild Coast Toll Route".

While it will take over most of the R61's route, this new Wild Coast Highway of the N2 will be realigned in some places. This new Wild Coast Highway will provide a shorter and more direct route from Lusikisiki to Port Edward while the current R61 passes through Flagstaff and Bizana on the route between those two towns (it will be shorter by 69 km). This new shortcut between Port Edward and Lusikisiki will have a tollgate constructed while there will also be a tollgate constructed on the current stretch from Lusikisiki to Mthatha, just outside of Port St Johns.

Once the N2 Wild Coast Toll Route is complete, the R61 designation will only apply to the section of the current route from Mthatha westwards through Komani, Cradock and Graaff-Reinet to Beaufort West. The old N2 section through KwaBhaca, Kokstad and Harding will also be given a different designation, probably R102.

As of 2021, the road classification numbers on the board signs on the R61 between Port Shepstone and Port Edward have already been changed to signs indicating the N2 as part of the Wild Coast Highway Project, indicating that the freeway from the Oribi Toll Plaza & N2 interchange in Port Shepstone southwards will no-longer be designated as the R61. Also, some of the Eastern Cape sections of the new Wild Coast Highway are being constructed as of 2021.

See also
Wapadsberg Pass
R306 (Eastern Cape) connecting road
N2 Wild Coast Toll Route

References

External links

 Routes Travel Info

Highways in South Africa
61
61
61
Toll roads in South Africa